William Gallacher (25 December 1881 – 12 August 1965) was a Scottish trade unionist, activist and communist.  He was one of the leading figures of the Shop Stewards' Movement in wartime Glasgow (the 'Red Clydeside' period) and a founding member of the Communist Party of Great Britain.  He served two terms in the House of Commons as the last Communist Member of Parliament (MP).

Early career 
Gallacher was born in Paisley, Scotland on 25 December 1881, the son of an Irish father and a Scottish mother. His father died when he was seven years old, and one of his earliest ambitions was to earn enough money so that his mother would no longer have to work as a washerwoman.  With his sisters, he finally achieved this goal at the age of nineteen, but his mother died shortly afterwards at the age of 54.

He began working at ten years old, and left school aged twelve. After a spell as a delivery boy for a grocer – where he had his first dispute with an employer – he found work in a sanitary engineering workshop.  He later had a spell as a steward on some transatlantic crossings, before beginning work at Albion Motor Works, Glasgow, in 1912. After spending 1913 in the United States visiting his sisters in Chicago, he erected scaffolding in Belfast.  Returning to Glasgow, he again found work at Albion Motor Works in 1914, just before the First World War broke out.

The "weakness for alcohol" shown by his father and elder brother, and the suffering this caused his mother, led him to become involved with the Temperance movement in his mid-adolescence. However, on discovering that colleagues had canvassed support for a director of a Trust Public House in the 1906 General Election, Gallacher ended his association with the organised Temperance movement.  He remained a lifelong teetotaller.

A subsequent period as a member of the Independent Labour Party ended quickly and he joined the Social Democratic Federation, which brought him into contact with John MacLean. In common with many socialists in mid-west Scotland, Gallacher was greatly influenced by MacLean, though they were later to have an acrimonious falling out.  The Paisley branch of the SDF introduced him to John Ross Campbell, who would also become a prominent British Communist and the editor of the Daily Worker from 1949 to 1959.

Wartime activities 
Gallacher was opposed to British involvement in World War I. He was Chairman of the Clyde Workers' Committee, an organisation that was formed to organise Clydeside workers and, in particular, to campaign against the Munitions of War Act 1915, which forbade engineers to leave the works in which they were employed.  David Lloyd George and Arthur Henderson met Gallacher and the Clyde Workers' Committee in Glasgow, but they were unwilling to back down on the issue. In 1916 the Clyde Workers' Committee journal, The Worker, was prosecuted under the Defence of the Realm Act 1914 for an article criticising the war. Gallacher and the editor John Muir were both found guilty and sent to prison, Gallacher for six months and Muir for one year.

Gallacher and the 40 Hours Movement 
After the war Gallacher was involved in the struggle for improving workers' conditions.  It was widely expected that the end of the war would be followed by widespread unemployment due to the re-entry of large numbers of demobilised soldiers and seamen into the workforce. Glasgow was expected to be particularly badly affected because a large proportion of its workforce was employed in war-related areas such as munitions and shipbuilding, which would suddenly contract with the end of the war. Gallacher and the Clyde Workers' Committee proposed a campaign to limit working-hours to thirty hours per week, which was altered to forty hours per week after the Glasgow Trades Council became involved.  In January 1919, the CWC and Trades Council launched a mass strike in support of the demand for a 40-hour working week.

During the course of the agitation, the police broke up the mass rally of striking workers at George Square, Glasgow on 31 January 1919. The Coalition government greatly overreacted to the strike, thinking that a Bolshevik insurrection was about to begin on Clydeside, and sent British Army troops onto the streets of Glasgow to control the situation. Whilst revolution was the furthest thing from the minds of the trade union leaders of the day, Gallacher later claimed that they should have marched to the barracks in the Maryhill district of the city and encouraged the Scottish troops there to leave them and join the workers against the government. The union leaders of the strike were arrested and charged with "instigating and inciting large crowds of persons to form part of a riotous mob". Gallacher was sent back to jail, being sentenced to five months.

Political career 
In 1920, Gallacher became a leading figure of the Communist Labour Party.  He led the grouping into the Communist Party of Great Britain (CPGB) and stood for election  to the House of Commons at Dundee (both in 1922 and 1923), West Fife (1929 and 1931) and Shipley (1930). He was eventually elected to represent the West Fife constituency at the 1935 general election.

In 1925, Gallacher was one of twelve members of the Communist Party convicted at the Old Bailey under the Incitement to Mutiny Act 1797, and one of the five defendants sentenced to twelve months' imprisonment. In 1936, Gallacher supported the views of members of the Labour Party such as Stafford Cripps and Aneurin Bevan who were arguing in favour of giving military assistance to the Spanish Popular Front government fighting against Franco's Nationalist forces in the Spanish Civil War. He criticized appeasement and attacked the National Government for considering inviting Hermann Göring to London. 

Gallacher lost his West Fife seat to the Labour Party at the 1950 general election, coming third behind the National Liberal candidate. He remained politically active serving as President of the CPGB from 1956 to 1963. In an article published in the party's Labour Monthly in April 1953 he appraised the career of Joseph Stalin; the Soviet First Secretary had died the previous month, concluding with the assertion that "his life ended with his work completed, for the Party and the Soviet people still under his wise guidance will go forward, resolute as he was resolute—to the new truly free society of Marx and Engels, of Lenin and of Stalin".

Gallacher was the author of several books, including The Case for Communism (1949), his autobiography, The Chosen Few (1940), and The Tyrant's Might is Passing (1954). He also wrote a book about his experiences during the First World War, Revolt on the Clyde, and The Last Memoirs of William Gallacher.

Gallacher died in Paisley on 12 August 1965, aged 83.

See also
 Mary Docherty

References 
Notes

Sources

External links 
 
 
 Gallacher, William (1881–1965) at the Marxist Internet Archive: Encyclopedia of Marxism: Glossary of People: Ga
 Writings by William Gallacher at the Marxists Internet Archive

Scottish people of Irish descent
1881 births
1965 deaths
British anti–World War I activists
Scottish autobiographers
Scottish communists
Scottish political writers
Scottish trade unionists
Marxist writers
Members of the Parliament of the United Kingdom for Scottish constituencies
Members of the Parliament of the United Kingdom for Fife constituencies
Politicians from Paisley, Renfrewshire
Prisoners and detainees of the United Kingdom
Red Clydeside
Scottish prisoners and detainees
UK MPs 1935–1945
UK MPs 1945–1950
Communist Party of Great Britain MPs
Scottish politicians convicted of crimes
20th-century Scottish politicians
Scottish republicans